Melvin Flynt – Da Hustler is the second solo studio album by the rapper Noreaga. The album was released on August 24, 1999, by Penalty Records.

Critical reception
The Chicago Tribune wrote that "Noreaga tackles familiar topics—inferior rappers, corrupt police—yet his signature off-pace delivery and the lethal beats backing him more than compensate for his typical lyrical fare."

Track listing

Charts

Certifications

References

1999 albums
Albums produced by the Neptunes
Albums produced by Mannie Fresh
Albums produced by Swizz Beatz
Albums produced by Trackmasters
N.O.R.E. albums